Abraham Joshua Heschel (January 11, 1907 – December 23, 1972) was a Polish-American rabbi and one of the leading Jewish theologians and Jewish philosophers of the 20th century. Heschel, a professor of Jewish mysticism at the Jewish Theological Seminary of America, authored a number of widely read books on Jewish philosophy and was a leader in the civil rights movement.

Biography
Abraham Joshua Heschel was born in Warsaw in 1907 as the youngest of six children of Moshe Mordechai Heschel and Reizel Perlow Heschel. He was descended from preeminent European rabbis on both sides of his family. His paternal great-great-grandfather and namesake was Rebbe Avraham Yehoshua Heshel of Apt in present-day Poland. His mother was also a descendant of Avraham Yehoshua Heshel and other Hasidic dynasties. His siblings were Sarah, Dvora Miriam, Esther Sima, Gittel, and Jacob. Their father Moshe died of influenza in 1916 when Abraham was nine. He was tutored by a Gerrer Hasid who introduced him to the thought of Rabbi Menachem Mendel of Kotzk.

After a traditional yeshiva education and studying for Orthodox rabbinical ordination (semicha), Heschel pursued his doctorate at the University of Berlin and rabbinic ordination at the non-denominational Hochschule für die Wissenschaft des Judentums. There he studied under some of the finest Jewish educators of the time: Chanoch Albeck, Ismar Elbogen, Julius Guttmann, Alexander Guttmann, and Leo Baeck. His mentor in Berlin was David Koigen. Heschel later taught Talmud at the Hochschule. He joined a Yiddish poetry group, Jung Vilna, and in 1933, published a volume of Yiddish poems, Der Shem Hamefoyrosh: Mentsch, dedicated to his father.

In late October 1938, when Heschel was living in a rented room in the home of a Jewish family in Frankfurt, he was arrested by the Gestapo and deported to Poland in the Polenaktion. He spent ten months lecturing on Jewish philosophy and Torah at Warsaw's Institute for Jewish Studies. Six weeks before the German invasion of Poland, Heschel left Warsaw for London with the help of Julian Morgenstern, president of Hebrew Union College, who had been working to obtain visas for Jewish scholars in Europe and Alexander Guttmann, later his colleague in Cincinnati, who secretly re-wrote his ordination certificate to meet American visa requirements.

Heschel's sister Esther was killed in a German bombing. His mother was murdered by the Nazis, and two other sisters, Gittel and Devorah, died in Nazi concentration camps. He never returned to Germany, Austria or Poland. He once wrote, "If I should go to Poland or Germany, every stone, every tree would remind me of contempt, hatred, murder, of children killed, of mothers burned alive, of human beings asphyxiated."

Heschel arrived in New York City in March 1940. He served on the faculty of Hebrew Union College (HUC), the main seminary of Reform Judaism, in Cincinnati for five years. In 1946, he took a position at the Jewish Theological Seminary of America (JTS) in New York City, the main seminary of Conservative Judaism. He served as professor of Jewish ethics and Mysticism until his death in 1972. At the time of his death, Heschel lived near JTS at 425 Riverside Drive in Manhattan.

Heschel married Sylvia Straus, a concert pianist, on December 10, 1946, in Los Angeles. Their daughter, Susannah Heschel, became a Jewish scholar in her own right.

Ideology

Heschel explicated many facets of Jewish thought, including studies on medieval Jewish philosophy, Kabbalah, and Hasidic philosophy. According to some scholars, he was more interested in spirituality than in critical text study; the latter was a specialty of many scholars at JTS. He was not given a graduate assistant for many years and he was mainly relegated to teach in the education school or the Rabbinical school, not in the academic graduate program. Heschel became friendly with his colleague Mordecai Kaplan. Though they differed in their approaches to Judaism, they had a very cordial relationship and visited each other's homes from time to time.

Heschel believed that the teachings of the Hebrew prophets were a clarion call for social action in the United States and inspired by this belief, he worked for African Americans' civil rights and spoke out against the Vietnam War.

He also criticized what he specifically called "pan-halakhism", or an exclusive focus upon religiously compatible behavior to the neglect of the non-legalistic dimension of rabbinic tradition.

Influence outside Judaism

Heschel is a widely read Jewish theologian whose most influential works include Man Is Not Alone, God in Search of Man, The Sabbath, and The Prophets. At the Second Vatican Council, as a representative of American Jews, Heschel persuaded the Catholic Church to eliminate or modify passages in its liturgy which demeaned the Jews, or referred to an expected conversion of the Jews to Christianity. His theological works argued that religious experience is a fundamentally human impulse, not just a Jewish one. He believed that no religious community could claim a monopoly on religious truth. For these and other reasons, Martin Luther King Jr. called Heschel "a truly great prophet." Heschel actively participated in the Civil Rights movement, and was a participant in the third Selma to Montgomery march, accompanying Dr. King and John Lewis.

Published works
 The Earth Is the Lord's: The Inner World of the Jew in Eastern Europe. 1949. 
 Man Is Not Alone: A Philosophy of Religion. 1951. 
 The Sabbath: Its Meaning for Modern Man. 1951. 
 Man's Quest for God: Studies in Prayer and Symbolism. 1954. 
 God in Search of Man: A Philosophy of Judaism. 1955. 
 The Prophets. 1962. 
 Who Is Man? 1965. 
 Israel: An Echo of Eternity. 1969. 
 A Passion for Truth. 1973. 
 I asked for Wonder: A spiritual anthology. 1983. 
 Heavenly Torah: As Refracted Through the Generations. 2005. 
 ; Theology of Ancient Judaism. [Hebrew]. 2 vols. London: Soncino Press, 1962. Third volume, New York: Jewish Theological Seminary, 1995.
 The Ineffable Name of God: Man: Poems. 2004. 
 . [Yiddish]. 2 v. (694 p.) Tel-Aviv: ha-Menorah, 1973. Added t.p.: Kotzk: the struggle for integrity (A Hebrew translation of vol. 1, Jerusalem: Magid, 2015). 
 . 45 p. Originally published: New-York: Shoken, 1946.

Man Is Not Alone (1951)
Man Is Not Alone: A Philosophy of Religion offers Heschel's views on how people can comprehend God. Judaism views God as being radically different from humans, so Heschel explores the ways that Judaism teaches that a person may have an encounter with the ineffable. A recurring theme in this work is the radical amazement that people feel when experiencing the presence of the Divine. Heschel then goes on to explore the problems of doubts and faith; what Judaism means by teaching that God is one; the essence of humanity and the problem of human needs; the definition of religion in general and of Judaism in particular; and human yearning for spirituality. He offers his views as to Judaism being a pattern for life.

The Sabbath (1951)
The Sabbath: Its Meaning for Modern Man is a work on the nature and celebration of Shabbat, the Jewish Sabbath. It is rooted in the thesis that Judaism is a religion of time, not space, and that the Sabbath symbolizes the sanctification of time. Heschel wrote that "Technical civilization is man's conquest of space. It is a triumph frequently achieved by sacrificing an essential ingredient of existence, namely, time." And that "To enhance our power in the world of space is our main objective" while warning that "We have often suffered from degradation by poverty, now we are threatened with degradation through power."

God in Search of Man (1955)
God in Search of Man: A Philosophy of Judaism is a companion volume to Man Is Not Alone. In this book Heschel discusses the nature of religious thought, how thought becomes faith, and how faith creates responses in the believer. He discusses ways that people can seek God's presence, and the radical amazement that we receive in return. He offers a criticism of nature worship; a study of humanity's metaphysical loneliness, and his view that we can consider God to be in search of humanity. The first section concludes with a study of Jews as a chosen people. Section two deals with the idea of revelation, and what it means for one to be a prophet. This section gives us his idea of revelation as an event, as opposed to a process. This relates to Israel's commitment to God. Section three discusses his views of how a Jew should understand the nature of Judaism as a religion. He discusses and rejects the idea that mere faith (without law) alone is enough, but then cautions against rabbis he sees as adding too many restrictions to Jewish law. He discusses the need to correlate ritual observance with spirituality and love, the importance of Kavanah (intention) when performing mitzvot. He engages in a discussion of religious behaviorism—when people strive for external compliance with the law, yet disregard the importance of inner devotion.

The Prophets (1962)
This work started out as his PhD thesis in German, which he later expanded and translated into English. Originally published in a two-volume edition, this work studies the books of the Hebrew prophets. It covers their lives and the historical context that their missions were set in, summarizes their work, and discusses their psychological state. In it Heschel puts forward what would become a central idea in his theology: that the prophetic (and, ultimately, Jewish) view of God is best understood not as anthropomorphic (that God takes human form) but rather as anthropopathic—that God has human feelings.

In his book The Prophets, Abraham Joshua Heschel describes the unique aspect of the Jewish prophets as compared to other similar figures. Whereas other nations have soothsayers and diviners who attempt to discover the will of their gods, according to Heschel the Hebrew prophets are characterized by their experience of what he calls theotropism—God turning towards humanity. Heschel argues for the view of Hebrew prophets as receivers of the "Divine Pathos", of the wrath and sorrow of God over his nation that has forsaken him. In this view, prophets do not speak for God so much as they remind their audience of God's voice for the voiceless, the poor and oppressed.

He writes:

Torah min HaShamayim (1962) 
Many consider Heschel's Torah min HaShamayim BeAspaklariya shel HaDorot, (Torah from Heaven in the mirror of the generations) to be his masterwork. The three volumes of this work are a study of classical rabbinic theology and aggadah, as opposed to halakha (Jewish law). It explores the views of the rabbis in the Mishnah, Talmud and Midrash about the nature of Torah, the revelation of God to mankind, prophecy, and the ways that Jews have used scriptural exegesis to expand and understand these core Jewish texts. In this work, Heschel views the 2nd century sages Rabbi Akiva and Ishmael ben Elisha as paradigms for the two dominant world-views in Jewish theology

Two Hebrew volumes were published during his lifetime by Soncino Press, and the third Hebrew volume was published posthumously by JTS Press in the 1990s. A new edition, including an expanded third volume, due to manuscripts which were found and edited by Dr. Dror Bondi, was published by Magid Press in 2021. An English translation of all three volumes, with notes, essays and appendices, was translated and edited by Rabbi Gordon Tucker, entitled Heavenly Torah: As Refracted Through the Generations. In its own right it can be the subject of intense study and analysis, and provides insight into the relationship between God and Man beyond the world of Judaism and for all Monotheism.

Who is Man? (1965) 
Heschel discusses the nature and role of man. In these three lectures, originally delivered in somewhat different form as The Raymond Fred West Memorial Lectures at Stanford University in May 1963, Dr. Heschel inquires into the logic of being human: What is meant by being human? What are the grounds on which to justify a human being's claim to being human? In the author's words, “We have never been as openmouthed and inquisitive, never as astonished and embarrassed at our ignorance about man. We know what he makes, but we do not know what he is or what to expect of him. Is it not conceivable that our entire civilization is built upon a misinterpretation of man? Or that the tragedy of man is due to the fact that he is a being who has forgotten the question: Who is Man? The failure to identify himself, to know what is authentic human existence, leads him to assume a false identity, to pretend to be what he is unable to be or to not accepting what is at the very root of his being. Ignorance about man is not lack of knowledge, but false knowledge.”

Prophetic Inspiration After the Prophets (1966)
Heschel wrote a series of articles, originally in Hebrew, on the existence of prophecy in Judaism after the destruction of the Holy Temple in Jerusalem in 70 CE. These essays were translated into English and published as Prophetic Inspiration After the Prophets: Maimonides and Others by the American Judaica publisher Ktav.

The publisher of this book states, "The standard Jewish view is that prophecy ended with the ancient prophets, somewhere early in the Second Temple era. Heschel demonstrated that this view is not altogether accurate. Belief in the possibility of continued prophetic inspiration, and belief in its actual occurrence existed throughout much of the medieval period, and it even exists in modern times. Heschel's work on prophetic inspiration in the Middle Ages originally appeared in two long Hebrew articles. In them, he concentrated on the idea that prophetic inspiration was even possible in post-Talmudic times, and, indeed, it had taken place at various schools in various times, from the Geonim to Maimonides and beyond."

Awards and commemoration
1970: National Jewish Book Award in the Jewish Thought category for Israel: An Echo of Eternity
Five schools have been named for Heschel, in Buenos Aires, Argentina the rabbinical School of the Seminario Rabinico Latinoamericano, the Upper West Side of New York City, Northridge, California, Agoura Hills, California, and Toronto, Ontario, Canada. In 2009, a highway in Missouri was named "Dr. Abraham Joshua Heschel Highway" after a Springfield, Missouri area Neo-Nazi group cleaned the stretch of highway as part of an "Adopt-A-Highway" plan. Heschel's daughter, Susannah, has objected to the adoption of her father's name in this context.

Heschel's papers are held in the Rubenstein Rare Book & Manuscript Library at Duke University.

On 17 October 2022, John Paul II Catholic University of Lublin inaugurated the Abraham J. Heschel Center for Catholic-Jewish Relations, attended by Catholic and Jewish figures, including Rabbi Abraham Skorka, Susannah Heschel, and Pope Francis.

See also
 
 List of peace activists

References

Further reading
Abraham Joshua Heschel: Prophetic Witness & Spiritual Radical: Abraham Joshua Heschel in America, 1940–1972, biography by Edward K. Kaplan 
 "The Encyclopedia of Hasidism" edited by Rabinowicz, Tzvi M.:  Jason Aronson, Inc., 1996.
  
 
 Ephraim Chamiel, Between Religion and reason - The Dialectical Position in Cotemporary Jewish Thought. Academic Studies Press, Boston 2020, Vol I, pp. 68–78.

External links

 Guide to the Abraham Joshua Heschel Papers, David M. Rubenstein Rare Book & Manuscript Library, Duke University.
 Heschel's role in Vatican II and his advocacy of interreligious respect
 Alan Brill Review of Heavenly Torah
 Arnold Jacob Wolf Review of Heavenly Torah
 David Blumenthal review of Heavenly Torah
 About Rabbi A. J. Heschel  The Heschel Center for Environmental Learning and Leadership

1907 births
1972 deaths
Activists for African-American civil rights
American Conservative rabbis
American ethicists
American Jewish theologians
American pacifists
Hebrew Union College – Jewish Institute of Religion faculty
Humboldt University of Berlin alumni
Jewish pacifists
Jewish Theological Seminary of America faculty
Rabbis from Cincinnati
Rabbis from Warsaw
Philosophers of Judaism
Philosophers of religion
Polish emigrants to the United States
Polish ethicists
Selma to Montgomery marches
Activists from Ohio
Jewish poets
Yiddish-language poets
Participants in the Second Vatican Council
Jewish American writers
Jewish ethicists
Jewish anti-racism activists
American anti–Vietnam War activists
Jewish emigrants from Nazi Germany to the United States
African American–Jewish relations
20th-century American philosophers
20th-century American rabbis
20th-century Polish philosophers
Hochschule für die Wissenschaft des Judentums alumni